Maia Linnea Wright also known as Junie (born 2 October 1997) is a Swedish singer-songwriter living in Stockholm.

Discography

EPs
 Firsts (2020)
Allt som har en början har ett slut (2021)

Singles

Featured singles

Notes

References

Living people
Swedish women singer-songwriters
Swedish singer-songwriters
1997 births
21st-century Swedish women singers
21st-century Swedish singers
Singers from Stockholm
English-language singers from Sweden